The 2011 Nigerian House of Representatives elections in Federal Capital Territory was held on , to elect members of the House of Representatives to represent Federal Capital Territory, Nigeria.

Overview

Summary

Results

Abaji/Gwagwalada/Kwali/Kuje 
Party candidates registered with the Independent National Electoral Commission to contest in the election. PDP candidate Isah Egah Dobi won the election, defeating ANPP Aliyu Daniel Baka Kwali and other party candidates.

Amac/Bwari 
Party candidates registered with the Independent National Electoral Commission to contest in the election. PDP candidate Zaphaniah Jisalo won the election, defeating CPC Yakubu M. Adamu and other party candidates.

References 

Federal Capital Territory House of Representatives elections
2011 elections in Nigeria
April 2011 events in Nigeria